Ikengo is a village in Équateur Province, Democratic Republic of the Congo, on the left bank of the Congo River.

Location

On 8 June 1883 the explorer Henry Morton Stanley passed by the Ikengo villages, Ikengo, Itumbu and Inganda.
He had been there before in 1877, and the people of each village asked him to come to their village and promised food, beer and wine.

Health

One of the main health problems in Ikengo is the lack of clean water, leading to illnesses such as diarrhea.
Malaria and acute respiratory infections are also common.
In 2021 the United Nations Development Programme (UNDP) handed over a health center in Ikengo to the local authorities.
It was receiving about 20 patients per day.
Due to its accessibility by canoe it served several nearby health zones.

Notable people

 Isidore Bakanja was born in Ikengo around 1885. He was beatified on 24 April 1994.

Notes

Sources

Populated places in the province of Équateur